Deleted programs may refer to:
 File deletion
 :Category:Lost television shows – many early television programs were either wiped or destroyed or never recorded in the first place

See also
 Wiping, the practice of erasing videotapes for reuse
 Deleted scene